The Official Lebanese Top 20 is the first weekly airplay chart in Lebanon, listing the most popular local and international hits across the country. The songs' popularity is solely determined by radio airplay frequency throughout a given week, audited and compiled by Ipsos SA. The Official Lebanese Top 20 was created by John Saad, an established Lebanese TV and radio personality. It is distributed through at least five media outlets ranging from TV stations to magazines and newspapers.

Media partners 
 Murr Television
 Mix FM Lebanon
 NRJ Lebanon
 Sawt Al Ghad
 The Daily Star
 Agenda Culturel  
 L'Hebdo Magazine
 Nadine Magazine
 Mondanité Magazine
 OMG - Outdoor Media Group
 Grand Cinemas
 Disc Jockey
 Born Interactive
 Beiruting
 Purple
 Apps2you

Number-one songs 
List of number-one songs of 2018 (Lebanon)

External links
Official website

Lebanese music
Record charts